The National Reined Cow Horse Association Champions and Awards are presented by the National Reined Cow Horse Association to outstanding individuals in the sport of Working cow horse, both people and equine. The NRCHA awards world champions on a yearly basis. It also awards million dollar earners for both riders and sires. The organization is headquartered in Pilot Point, Texas.

Champions

Snaffle Bit Champions 

Source:

Source:

Derby Champions 

Source:

Million Dollar Riders 

*Rider Earnings as of June 30, 2019

Source:

Million Dollar Sires 

*produce earnings as of June 30, 2019
Source

See also 
 Campdrafting
 Cutting (sport)
 Horse show
 National Reining Horse Association
 National Reining Horse Association Hall of Fame
 National Reining Horse Association Champions and Awards
 National Reined Cow Horse Association
 National Reined Cow Horse Association Hall of Fame
 Ranch sorting
 Reining
 Stock horse
 Team penning
 Western riding
 Western saddle

References

External links
 Official Site
 National Reined Cow Horse Association (Video)
 What is Reined Cow Horse aka Working Cow Horse (Photos & Video)

Western-style riding
Working stock horse sports
Reining
Horse showing and exhibition
Equestrian organizations